The third World Cup of Softball was held in Oklahoma City, Oklahoma USA between July 12 and July 16, 2007.  USA won their second World Cup by defeating Japan 3-0 in the Championship Game.

Final standings

Position Round

External links
 USA softball website

World Cup of Softball
World Cup Of Softball, 2007